Kerry Churchill Minnear (born 2 January 1948 in the town of Shaftesbury in Dorset, England) is a multi-instrumentalist musician. He's known primarily for his work with the progressive rock band Gentle Giant from 1970 to 1980.

He graduated from the Royal Academy of Music in London with a major in musical composition. As a member of Gentle Giant, he contributed to all 11 albums over the 10 year life of the band. Though he is adept at several instruments, he primarily played keyboards and provided back up and lead vocals. In addition to keyboard, he also played a multitude of other instruments such as the cello, tenor recorder, and classical percussion (including vibraphone, marimba, xylophone, timpani and snare drum). 

He also composed the original musical soundtrack for the 1996 video game Azrael's Tear starring Ray Shulman.

He now lives in Solihull (West Midlands) with his wife Lesley and has three children, Sally, Sam and Susie. He also composes for cinema and television.

In the years following the dissolution of Gentle Giant, Minnear was a member of a Christian music band, The Reapers, in the 1980s. He was also a teacher and church organist. He and his wife Lesley own Alucard Music, which releases Gentle Giant CDs and DVDs. He also plays occasionally with the group Three Friends which reproduces Gentle Giant songs in concerts.  Three Friends is composed of: Mick Wilson singing lead vocals, Gary Green and Andrew Williams on guitar, Roger Carey on bass, Kerry Minnear and John Donaldson on piano and keyboards, and Malcolm Mortimore on drums. Minnear, Green and Mortimore have all been members of Gentle Giant, with Minnear and Green serving continuously and Mortimore solely on the album Three Friends.

His son Sam Minnear is a founding member of alternative pop group Misty's Big Adventure.

The Reapers 
 1982 : Star of the morning
 1984 : Come And Praise
 1986 : Christmas Joy

References

External links
 Blazemonger.com

1948 births
Living people
English rock keyboardists
Progressive rock keyboardists
British performers of Christian music
People from Shaftesbury
Gentle Giant members
Alumni of the Royal Academy of Music